Richard Wolff (born 12 June 1976 in Prague, Czechoslovakia) is a motorcycle speedway rider who first rode in the UK for the Trelawny Tigers in the Premier League.  He stayed with the Tigers until their closure in 2003. He then spent  the 2005 season with the Reading Racers.

Honours 
Individual European Championship:
2003 - 14th place (3 points)
2004 - 15th place (2 points)
European Club Champions' Cup:
2004 - 4th place (12 points)
2006 - 4th place in Semi-Final 2 (2 points)
2007 - 3rd place in Semi-Final 2 (7 points)

References 

1976 births
Living people
Czech speedway riders
Trelawny Tigers riders
Reading Racers riders
Sportspeople from Prague